The short ton (symbol ST) is a measurement unit equal to . It is commonly used in the United States, where it is known simply as a ton, although the term is ambiguous, the single word being variously used for short, long, and metric ton.

The various tons are defined as units of mass. They are sometimes used as units of  weight, the force exerted by a mass at standard gravity (e.g., short ton-force). One short ton exerts a weight at one standard gravity of 2,000 pound-force (lbf).

United States

In the United States, a short ton is usually known simply as a "ton", without distinguishing it from the tonne, known there as the "metric ton", or the long ton also known as the "imperial ton". There are, however, some U.S. applications where unspecified tons normally mean long tons (for example, naval ships) or metric tons (world grain production figures).

See also

Ton

References

Units of mass
Ton, short